Nebria picicornis is a species of ground beetle from Nebriinae subfamily that can be found in European countries such as Austria, Belgium, Czech Republic, France, Germany, Italy, Poland, Slovakia, Spain, Switzerland, and Ukraine. It also common in Asia, particularly in countries like Iran and Turkey. The species are black coloured and have orange legs and head.

Subspecies
Nebria picicornis esfandiari Morvan, 1974
Nebria picicornis luteipes Chaudoir, 1850
Nebria picicornis picicornis Fabricius, 1801
Nebria picicornis radjabii Morvan, 1973

References

picicornis
Beetles described in 1801
Beetles of Asia
Beetles of Europe